The Stewart River is a river located in the Cape York Peninsula of Far North Queensland, Australia.

The river flows generally south, then south by east and then finally east, joined by two minor tributaries before reaching its mouth and emptying into the Coral Sea at Port Stewart. The river descends  over its  course.

The river was named after a member of the 1872 exploration party led by William Hann with the family name of Stewart.

See also

References

Rivers of Far North Queensland
Bodies of water of the Coral Sea